The South Carolina slimy salamander (Plethodon variolatus) is a species of salamander in the family Plethodontidae. It is endemic to the south-eastern United States, where it is restricted to a small portion of the Atlantic coastal plain from South Carolina to extreme south-eastern Georgia. Its natural habitats are mixed forests, bottomland hardwood forests, and longleaf pine savannas.

References 

Amphibians of the United States
Plethodon
Amphibians described in 1818
Endemic fauna of the United States